Kenneth J. Lawrence (born 1964) is an American astronomer and a discoverer of minor planets.

Credited by the Minor Planet Center with the discovery of 32 numbered asteroids between 1989 and 1994, he has also co-discovered 152P/Helin-Lawrence, a periodic comet from the Jupiter family. He was also a participant in the Palomar Planet-Crossing Asteroid Survey.

The main-belt asteroid 4969 Lawrence, discovered by Eleanor Helin in 1986, is named in his honor. Naming citation was published on 14 July 1992.

List of discovered minor planets

See also

References 
 

1964 births
American astronomers
Discoverers of asteroids

Living people